Ectoedemia deschkai is a moth of the family Nepticulidae. It is found in Greece (the mainland and the Aegean Islands).

The larvae feed on Hypericum hircinum and Hypericum triquetrifolium. They mine the leaves of their host plant. The mine consists of a narrow, mostly tortuous corridor that is almost filled with frass. The corridor widens into a blotch, with the frass concentrated in the centre. The blotch can overrun most of the older corridor. Pupation takes place within the mine, in an elongated silken cocoon. Before the pupation takes place, the larva makes a silken tube connecting the cocoon with the spot at the leaf underside where the adult moth appears.

External links
Fauna Europaea
bladmineerders.nl

Nepticulidae
Moths of Europe
Moths described in 1978